This is a list of episodes of the British comedy talk-show Room 101. The first three series were hosted by Nick Hancock and then Paul Merton hosted series 4 to 11. Starting with series 12, Frank Skinner is the host of a redesigned programme featuring three guests competing to get their items into Room 101.



Episodes

Series 1

Series 2

Series 3

Series 4

Series 5

Series 6

Series 7

Series 8

Series 9

Series 10

Series 11

Series 12

Series 13

Series 14

Series 15

Series 16

Series 17

Series 18

Footnotes

References

External links

BBC-related lists
Lists of British comedy television series episodes